The men's pole vault event at the 2015 African Games was held on 16 September.

Results

References

Pole